Queen Alexandra or Alexandra of Denmark (1844–1925) was Queen consort of the United Kingdom.

Queen Alexandra may also refer to:

People
 Salome Alexandra (139 BC–67 BC), Queen of the Hasmonean Kingdom of Israel
 Alexandra of Yugoslavia, Queen consort of Yugoslavia
 Alexandra Feodorovna (Alix of Hesse)
 Alexandra Feodorovna (Charlotte of Prussia)

Other uses
 Queen Alexandra, Edmonton, a school of Canada
 Queen Alexandra Bridge, a bridge across the River Wear
 Queen Alexandra College, a college in Harborne, Birmingham
 Queen Alexandra Dock, a dock in Cardiff Bay
 Queen Alexandra Elementary School, an elementary school in Vancouver
 Queen Alexandra Hospital, a hospital serving the city of Portsmouth
 Queen Alexandra Hospital, Hobart, an Australian hospital
 Queen Alexandra Range, a major mountain range in East Antarctica
 Queen Alexandra Stakes, a flat horse race

See also
 Queen Alexandra's birdwing (Ornithoptera alexandrae), a species of butterfly